Lord Edward Thynne (23 January 1807 – 4 February 1884) was an English nobleman. After a short career as an army officer, he sat in the House of Commons for two periods, separated by 26 years, and opposed parliamentary reform on both occasions.

A duellist and philanderer who outlived his two wives, Thynne gambled away his own wealth and that of his first wife.  In 1881, the aged Thynne was described by Vanity Fair magazine as a "hoary old reprobate".

Early life 

Thynne was the 8th child of Thomas Thynne, 2nd Marquess of Bath and Isabella Byng, daughter of the 4th Viscount Torrington.  He was educated at Charterhouse and then matriculated in 1825 to Oriel College, Oxford. After graduating with a Bachelor of Arts degree in March 1828,
he was commissioned in April 1828 as a second lieutenant in the Duke of York's rifle corps.

He retired from the British Army in June 1830
when he married Elizabeth Mellish, the heir to William Mellish a wealthy naval contractor.
The novelist Emily Eden described him in a letter at that time as "totally unlike all the Thynnes I ever saw—full of fun and dashes out everything that comes into his head".

Career 
At the 1831 general election his father bought him a seat as Member of Parliament (MP) for the rotten borough of Weobley, alongside his brother Lord Henry Frederick Thynne.
The borough was disenfranchised under the Reform Act 1832, which he and his brother had repeatedly voted against.

Despite having been given £20,000 by his father when he married in 1830, by 1832 Thynne's marriage and finances were in deep trouble.  His wife was estranged from him, and he was repeatedly sued by his creditor Thomas Slingsby Duncombe; in response he canvassed against Dubscombe at the Finsbury by-election in 1834, and at the following year's general election.

In 1837, he fought a duel on Battersea Fields with a Mr. Passmore, over "a young lady". Each fired three shots without effect.

In 1835 his father gave him a further £60,000 to clear his debts. However, after his father's death in 1837, his family cut him off, and by August of that year he was imprisoned for debt in the Queen's Bench Prison in Southwark.
Thynne and Dunscombe resolved their quarrel in November, triggering Thynne's release from prison and allowing him to avoid bankruptcy.
When Thynne was discharged from insolvency at the end of that month, the court was told that his debts were £221,059 (equivalent to £ in ), which The Spectator described as an "enormous sum".

After the death of Elizabeth's father, when his estate was reported at nearly £3 million
(equivalent to £ in ), she unsuccessfully sued her family for more of her father's wealth (having been given £100,000 on her marriage). Her estate was worth only £3,000 when she died in 1849.

Thynne married again in 1853, to Cecilia Gore, daughter of the novelist Catherine Gore. As a girl, Cecilia had been famous for her wasp waist.
The historian Macaulay described the union in his memoirs as "the noosing of a young – or rather a defiant young flirt to an old roué".

Thynne was a skilled marksman who in 1851 shot a golden eagle with a rifle at a hundred yards range, while deer stalking in Scotland as a guest of the Earl of Malmesbury. The killing of the  bird was reported to be the only instance of a flying eagle being killed with a single ball.
He resumed his military career in 1855, when he was appointed as a cornet in the Wiltshire Yeomanry Cavalry. In 1863, he was commissioned as a lieutenant in the 18th Somerset Volunteer Rifle Corps

Return to Parliament 

In July 1856, the Liberal MP Viscount Dungarvan succeeded to the peerage, triggering a by-election in July for his Commons seat in the borough of Frome in Somerset. Thynne was one of three candidates nominated, and a poll was demanded, but Thynne later withdrew. The seat was won by the Liberal William George Boyle, a relative of Dungarvan's.

The following year, at the 1857 general election, Thynne was nominated again, and this time did not withdraw. However, he polled poorly, coming third behind two Liberal candidates. Boyle lost the seat to fellow Liberal Donald Nicoll.

At the 1859 general election Thynne was returned to the House of Commons after a 26-year absence. Standing as an "anti-ballot conservative", he had defeated the sitting Nicoll by 194 votes to 147.
A petition was lodged against the result,
but subsequently withdrawn amidst a dispute about allegations that Nicoll had made improper use of Disraeli's name, a charge which Nicoll strenuously denied.
Thynne did not contest the 1865 election,
when Sir Henry Rawlinson regained the seat for the Liberals.

Some time in 1872, Thynne called at the London home of the 5th Marquess Townshend, and eloped to France with his wife Clementina (née Duff). Clementina, who was 16 years Townshend's junior and 40 years younger than Thynne, had been neglected by her philanthropist husband, and was described as "more than willing" to escape. Her husband had to wait 9 years for his revenge.

At the Salisbury Petty Sessions in May 1881, Thynne described how he had been accosted by Lord Townshend and two accomplices on the road between Laverstock and Salisbury. A Colonel Nepean held the pony's head while Townshend struck him several times with the handle of a horse whip. Thynne acknowledged having eloped with Lady Townshend in 1872, but noted that the Marquis had never sued for divorce, and alleged that Lord Macduff had attacked him over the same matter while he was abroad.

Townshend was convicted of the assault, and sentenced to a fine of £500 or three months in prison. Townshend denounced the court, while Vanity Fair reported unnamed others as saying "the only regret is that he [Thynne] was not thrashed earlier and worse".

In January 1884, Thynne fell ill with rheumatic gout.  He died on 4 February 1884, at his home Laverstock, near Salisbury.
His wife Cecilia died in 1879.  They had one child, a daughter: Mary Isabella Emma Thynne who died in 1906.

References

External links 
 
 , second wife of Lord Edward

1807 births
1884 deaths
Edward
Younger sons of marquesses
People educated at Charterhouse School
Alumni of Oriel College, Oxford
King's Royal Rifle Corps officers
Members of the Parliament of the United Kingdom for English constituencies
UK MPs 1831–1832
UK MPs 1859–1865
English duellists
People imprisoned for debt